is a natural satellite of Jupiter, and is one of the smallest known natural satellites in the Solar System. It was discovered by a team of astronomers from the University of Hawaii led by Scott S. Sheppard in 2003.

 is about 1 kilometre (0.6 miles) in diameter, and orbits Jupiter at an average distance of 21,600 Mm in 647 days, at an inclination of 155° to the ecliptic, in a retrograde direction and with an eccentricity of 0.366. It was initially thought to the innermost of the retrograde satellites of Jupiter, but recovery observations have shown that it is an ordinary member of the Ananke group.

This moon was considered lost until late 2020, when it was recovered in archival CFHT images from 2001-2011 by amateur astronomer Kai Ly. The recovery of the moon was announced by the Minor Planet Center on 13 January 2021.

References

Moons of Jupiter
Ananke group
Irregular satellites
20030208
Discoveries by Scott S. Sheppard
Moons with a retrograde orbit